Chyorny Bugor is a rural locality (a settlement) in Bolshemogoysky Selsoviet of Volodarsky District, Astrakhan Oblast, Russia. The population was 20 as of 2010. There is 1 street.

Geography 
Chyorny Bugor is located on the Sarbay River, 16 km southeast of Volodarsky (the district's administrative centre) by road. Bolshoy Mogoy is the nearest rural locality.

References 

Rural localities in Volodarsky District, Astrakhan Oblast